"I Pledge My Love" is a ballad by R&B vocal duo Peaches & Herb from their LP, Twice the Fire.  It became a hit in early 1980 in the U.S. (#19) and Canada (#23). It was also a Top 40 R&B and Adult Contemporary hit.

The song had an unusually long chart run for only just making the top-twenty, spending five months on the U.S. charts and six months on the Canadian charts. Billboard ranked it as the 80th biggest U.S. hit of 1980.  "I Pledge My Love" also reached number one on the New Zealand Singles Chart for one week in May 1980.

Chart history

Weekly charts

Year-end charts

Certifications

References

External links
 Lyrics of this song
 

1980s ballads
1980 singles
1979 songs
Peaches & Herb songs
Male–female vocal duets
Polydor Records singles
Songs written by Freddie Perren
Songs written by Dino Fekaris
Rhythm and blues ballads
Number-one singles in New Zealand